World Machine is the sixth studio album by British pop group Level 42, released in 1985. It was the band's breakthrough album internationally and features one of their most successful singles, "Something About You".

Composition
This release marked a transition from their jazz-funk beginnings to the funky pop they are best known for―a transition which eventually resulted in the departure of drummer Phil Gould subsequent to the release of their follow up album Running in the Family.

The album features the singles "Something About You" (the band's only American top 10 hit, peaking at number 7, and a success internationally) and "Leaving Me Now". Also featured is "Physical Presence", the song from which the name for their first live record was taken.

The album was re-released in 2000 as a 2-CD set also including the band's previous album, True Colours. In 2007, World Machine was re-released as a 2-CD remastered Deluxe Edition containing several remixes and live versions as bonus tracks.

The cover photo is of Hafnarfjall, a mountain in west Iceland.

Commercial performance
World Machine peaked at No. 3 on the UK Albums Chart, staying on the chart for 72 weeks. It was also the band's first album to enter the US Billboard 200, peaking at number 18 and staying on the chart for 36 weeks. Album sales have reached over three million copies, being certified 2× Platinum by the BPI.

Track listing 

Note: The American versions of the album feature a re-ordered track listing, as well as the substitution of the tracks "Hot Water" and "The Chant Has Begun" (both of which had originally appeared on the band's previous album True Colours) for "I Sleep On My Heart" and "Coup d'état." The vinyl U.S. version of the album featured the single versions of both "Hot Water" and "The Chant Has Begun," while the full-length album version of "The Chant Has Begun" did appear on the U.S. CD edition. ("Dream Crazy," which only appeared on certain European versions of the album did not appear on any of the North American versions).

Bonus tracks, released 2000

Bonus tracks (deluxe edition), released 2007
 "World Machine" (Live Hammersmith Odeon 1.2.86) *
 "Leaving Me Now" (Live Hammersmith Odeon 1.2.86) *
 "Something About You" (Live Hammersmith Odeon 1.2.86) *
 "Coup d'état" (Backwards Mix) – originally the B-side to the "Something About You" single
 "Something About You" (Shep Pettibone Mix)
 "I Sleep On My Heart" (Live at Ryde Theatre, Isle of Wight Nov 2000)
 "Dream Crazy" (Live at Ryde Theatre, Isle of Wight Nov 2000)
 "Lying Still" (Live at Ryde Theatre, Isle of Wight Nov 2000)
 "Physical Presence" (Live at Hammersmith Apollo, London, Nov 2003)
 "Leaving Me Now" (Live at Hammersmith Apollo, London, Nov 2003)
 "World Machine" (Phunk Investigation Club Mix) – Electrokingdom featuring Mark King

Personnel 

Level 42
 Mark King – bass, vocals
 Mike Lindup – keyboards, vocals
 Boon Gould – guitars
 Phil Gould – drums
with:
 Wally Badarou – keyboards,  Synclavier, additional vocals
 Gary Barnacle – saxophones

2007 Re-issue:
 Lyndon Connah – keyboards and vocals (Deluxe edition CD2, tracks 6–10)
 Nathan King – guitars and vocals (Deluxe edition CD2, tracks 6–10)
 Gary Husband – drums (Deluxe edition CD2, tracks 6–10)
 Sean Freeman – saxophone and vocals (Deluxe edition CD2, tracks 9, 10)

Production 
 Level 42 – producers
 Wally Badarou – producer 
 Julian Mendelsohn – production assistant, recording, mixing 
 Carlos Olms – digital engineer 
 Alwyn Clayden – art direction 
 Red Ranch – sleeve design 
 Mike Trevillion – front cover photography 
 Iain McKell – back cover photography 
 Paul Crockford – management 
 Paul King – management 
 Outlaw Management – management company

Charts

References

1985 albums
Level 42 albums
Albums produced by Wally Badarou
Polydor Records albums